Broxeele is a commune in the Nord department in northern France.

Name
The name is derived from the Dutch Broec sele (modern name: Broksele), which means "house (with one room) in the marsh" (in 1072: Brocsela). The name Brussels has exactly the same etymology.

Population

International relations
Broxeele and Brussels are sister cities and the city of Brussels has given a replica of Manneken Pis to Broxeele.

Heraldry

See also
Communes of the Nord department

References

Communes of Nord (French department)
French Flanders